Modern Poetry in Translation is a literary magazine and publisher based in the United Kingdom. The magazine was started by Ted Hughes and Daniel Weissbort in 1965. It was relaunched by King's College London in 1992. The College published it until 2003. It publishes contemporary poetry from all around the world, in English.

Its first issue was a landmark. Writers previously unknown to the West were introduced by Hughes and Weissbort. The list included Miroslav Holub, Yehuda Amichai, Ivan Lalić, Zbigniew Herbert, Czesław Miłosz (who would later win the Nobel Prize in Literature), Andrei Voznesensky, and Vasko Popa (later written of as "one of the best European poets writing today" by literary critic John Bayley of Oxford University in an essay in The New York Review of Books on a translation of Popa by Anne Pennington with an introduction by Ted Hughes in "The Persea Series of Poetry in Translation," general editor Daniel Weissbort).

Founder and editor Weissbort headed The University of Iowa translation workshop program for decades. Of his many books, Weissbort edited Translation: Theory and Practice: A Historical Reader that was published by the Oxford University Press, edited with Astradur Eysteinsson. The London Guardian newspaper wrote that Weissbort founded Carcanet Press. The Wall Street Journal excerpted a Weissbort translation of Missing Person by Patrick Modiano after Modiano received the Nobel Prize for Literature.

On the Stanford University site of  The Book Haven by Cynthia Haven, in an obituary of Daniel Weissbort, Daniel Weissbort is defined as a "master translator." Also on this Stanford University web site, Weissbort is called a champion of translation. Weissbort has genius in translation, obituary of Weissbort in Translationista.

To celebrate the magazine's 50th anniversary, a microsite was developed to present the first issue of Modern Poetry in Translation in its entirety, including high resolution scans of the original print document. The microsite was expanded to a full website at www.modernpoetryintranslation.com in 2018. The original anniversary microsite, and first issue, is available at modernpoetryintranslation.com/home-50 via the Wayback Machine.

From 2012 to 2017 Sasha Dugdale was the editor of Modern Poetry in Translation, overseeing a redesign and publishing sixteen issues of the magazine as well as its fiftieth year anniversary anthology Centres of Cataclysm (Bloodaxe, 2016). As of March 2023, the current editor is Khairani Barokka.

Magazine issues 
Clean Hands: Focus on the Pandemic in Europe (2021 No 1)

Origins of the Fire Emoji: Focus on Dead [Women] Poets (2020 No 3)

The World for a Moment: Focus on Czech Poetry (2020 No 2)

Dream Colours: Focus on Japan (2020 No 1)

I Have not Known a Grief Like This: Focus on Extinction (2019 No 3)

The Illuminated Paths: Focus on Poets of the Maghreb (2019 No 2)

Our Small Universe: Focus on Languages of the United Kingdom (2019 No 1)

In a Winter City: Focus on Hungary and Ted Hughes (2018 No 3) See more

The House of Thirst: Focus on LGBTQ+ Poetry (2018 No 2 ) See more

Profound Pyromania: Focus on Caribbean Poetry (2018 No 1) See more

War of the Beasts and the Animals: Russian and Ukrainian Poetry (2017 No 3) See more

A Blossom Shroud: Focus on the Poets of Shubbak (2017 No 2) See more

Songs of the Shattered Throat: Focus on the Languages of India (2017 No 1) See more

The Blue Vein: Focus on Korean Poetry (2016 No 3) See more

One Thousand Suns: Focus on the Languages of Africa (2016 No 2) See more

The Great Flight: Refugee Focus (2016 No 1) See more

The Tangled Route: Uruguayan Focus (2015 No 3) See more

I WISH... Children's Focus: (2015 No 2)

Scorched Glass: Iranian Focus (2015 No 1)

The Singing of the Scythe: Poetry of The First World War (2014 No 3)

The Constellation: Poetry International (2014 No 2)

Twisted Angels: Brazilian Focus (2014 No 1)

Secret Agents of Sense: Polish Focus (2013 No 3)

Between Clay and Star: Romanian Focus (2013 No 2)

Strange Tracks: Focus on Dutch Poetry (2013 No 1)

References 

 See more issues

External links 
 
A review of MPT in The Independent
A review of MPT in The Guardian
A review of MPT in the Oxonian Review

Literary magazines published in the United Kingdom
English-language magazines
King's College London
Literary translation magazines
Magazines published in London
Magazines established in 1965
Mass media in Oxford
Poetry magazines published in the United Kingdom
Ted Hughes
Triannual magazines published in the United Kingdom